Olga Göllner (born 8 November 1930 – 12 November 2017) was a Romanian gymnast. She competed in seven events at the 1952 Summer Olympics.

References

External links
 

1930 births
2017 deaths
Romanian female artistic gymnasts
Olympic gymnasts of Romania
Gymnasts at the 1952 Summer Olympics
Sportspeople from Cluj-Napoca